The National Book Award for Fiction is one of five annual National Book Awards, which recognize outstanding literary work by United States citizens. Since 1987 the awards have been administered and presented by the National Book Foundation, but they are awards "by writers to writers." The panelists are five "writers who are known to be doing great work in their genre or field."

General fiction was one of four categories when the awards were re-established in 1950. For several years beginning 1980, prior to the Foundation, there were multiple fiction categories: hardcover, paperback, first novel or first work of fiction; from 1981 to 1983 hardcover and paperback children's fiction; and only in 1980 five awards to mystery fiction, science fiction, and western fiction. When the Foundation celebrated the 60th postwar awards in 2009, all but three of the 77 previous winners in fiction categories were in print. The 77 included all eight 1980 winners but excluded the 1981 to 1983 children's fiction winners.

The award recognizes one book written by a U.S. citizen and published in the U.S. from December 1 to November 30. The National Book Foundation accepts nominations from publishers until June 15, requires mailing nominated books to the panelists by August 1, and announces five finalists in October. The winner is announced on the day of the final ceremony in November. The award is $10,000 and a bronze sculpture; other finalists get $1000, a medal, and a citation written by the panel.

Authors who have won the award more than once include such noted figures as William Faulkner, John Updike, William Gaddis, Jesmyn Ward, and Philip Roth, each having won the award on two occasions along with numerous other nominations. Saul Bellow won the award in three decades (1954, 1965, 1971) and is the only author to have won the National Book Award for Fiction three times.

National Book Awards for Fiction
From 1935 to 1941 there were six annual awards for general fiction and the "Bookseller Discovery" or "Most Original Book" was sometimes a novel. From 1980 to 1985 there were six annual awards to first novels or first works of fiction. In 1980 there were five awards to mystery, western, or science fiction. There have been many awards to fiction in the Children's or Young People's categories.

Honorees, general fiction

This list covers only the post-war awards (pre-war awards follow) to general fiction for adult readers: one annual winner from 1950 except two undifferentiated winners 1973 to 1975, dual hardcover and paperback winners 1980 to 1983.

For each award, the winner is listed first followed by the finalists. Unless otherwise noted, the year represents the year the award was given for books published in the prior year. Thus, the award year 1950 is for books published in 1949.

1950s

1960s

1970s

1980s 
For 1980 to 1983 this list covers the paired "Fiction (hardcover)" and "Fiction (paperback)" awards in that order. Hard and paper editions were distinguished only in these four years; none of the paperback winners were original; in their first editions all had been losing finalists in 1979 or 1981.

From 1980 to 1985 there was also one award for first novel or first work of fiction and in 1980 there were five more awards for mystery, western, and science fiction. None of those are covered here.

1980-1983 
1983 entries were published during 1982; winners in 27 categories were announced April 13 and privately celebrated April 28, 1983.

1984 entries for the "revamped" awards in three categories were published November 1983 to October 1984; eleven finalists were announced October 17. Winners were announced and celebrated November 15, 1984.

1984-1989

1990s

2000s

2010s

2020s

Early awards for fiction

The National Book Awards for 1935 to 1940 annually recognized the "Most Distinguished Novel" (1935–1936) or "Favorite Fiction" (1937–1940). Furthermore, works of fiction were eligible for the "Bookseller Discovery" and "Most Original Book" awards; fiction winners are listed here.

There was only one National Book Award for 1941, the Bookseller Discovery, which recognized the novel Hold Autumn In Your Hand by George Perry; then none until the 1950 revival in three categories including Fiction.

Most Distinguished Novel (1935–1936)

1935: Rachel Field, Time Out of Mind

1936: Margaret Mitchell, Gone With the Wind

Favorite Fiction (1937–1940)
1937: A. J. Cronin, The Citadel
 Conrad Richter, The Sea of Grass
 Kenneth Roberts, Northwest Passage
 Leonard Q. Ross (Leo Rosten), The Education of H*Y*M*A*N K*A*P*L*A*N (short stories)

1938: Daphne Du Maurier, Rebecca

1939: John Steinbeck, The Grapes of Wrath
 Sholom Asch, The Nazarene

1940: Richard Llewellyn, How Green Was My Valley

Bookseller Discovery (1936–1941)

1936: Norah Lofts, I Met a Gypsy (short stories)

1937: Lawrence Watkin, On Borrowed Time (novel)
see 1937 Fiction

1938: see nonfiction

1939: Elgin Groseclose, Ararat (novel)
 Chard Powers Smith, Artillery of Time, I

1940: see nonfiction

1941: George Sessions Perry, Hold Autumn in Your Hand (novel)

Most Original Book (1935–1939)

1935: Charles G. Finney, The Circus of Dr. Lao (novel)

1936: see nonfiction

1937: see nonfiction
 see 1937 Fiction

1938: see nonfiction

1939: Dalton Trumbo, Johnny Got His Gun (novel)
 Geoffrey Household, Rogue Male

Repeat winners
See Winners of multiple U.S. National Book Awards

Notes

References

External links
The Contenders: 61 Years of National Book Award Fiction Finalists, special exhibit, June 2012. "Down Memory Lane With the National Book Awards (and Not Just the Winners), The New York Times, June 22, 2012.

National Book Award
American fiction awards
Awards established in 1950
1950 establishments in the United States